The 2019–20 SIU Edwardsville Cougars men's basketball team represented Southern Illinois University Edwardsville during the 2019–20 NCAA Division I men's basketball season. The Cougars, led by first-year head coach Brian Barone, played their home games in the First Community Arena
at Vadalabene Center  in Edwardsville, Illinois as members of the Ohio Valley Conference. They finished the season 8–23, 5–13 in OVC play to finish in a tie for tenth place. They failed to qualify for the OVC tournament.

Previous season 
The Cougars finished the 2018–19 season 10–21, 6–12 in OVC play to finish in a three-way tie for seventh place. The Cougars received the No. 8 seed in the OVC Tournament where they lost in the first round to Morehead State.

On March 11, 2019, SIUE announced that coach Jon Harris' contract had not been renewed after a four-year record of 31–88.

Preseason 
On the day after Jon Harris' termination was announced, Brian Barone was named as interim head coach and was quickly confirmed with a two-year contract only days later.

Troy Pierce was hired to fill the assistant coach vacancy created by Barone's promotion.

Director of Operations Casey Wyllie left to be an assistant coach at Olney Central College and was replaced by Colin Schneider.

Nine players, five of whom saw major playing time, returned- from the 10–21 team of 2018–10. They are joined by one junior who saw major action as a freshman and sophomore but sat out last season as a medical "redshirt", two freshmen, three transfers from major junior college programs, and one transfer from another Division I program. Of the three members of the squad who are former walk-ons, two are in their second season as Cougars, and one is in his fourth year.
 
In a vote of conference coaches and sports information directors, SIUE was picked to finish in 10th place in the OVC.

Postseason
Finishing tied for tenth place, the Cougars did not qualify for the OVC Tournament.

Roster
Source =

Schedule and results

|-
!colspan=9 style=| Exhibition

|-
!colspan=9 style=| Non-conference regular season

|-
!colspan=9 style=| Ohio Valley Conference regular season

References

SIU Edwardsville
SIU Edwardsville Cougars men's basketball seasons
Edward
Edward